Glenarm is a village in County Antrim, Northern Ireland

Glenarm or Glen Arm may also refer to:
Glenarm, Illinois, an unincorporated community in Sangamon County
Glenarm, Kentucky
Glen Arm, Maryland, an unincorporated community in Baltimore County
Glenarm, Ontario, a community in the City of Kawartha Lakes

See also
Glenarm Power Plant, in Pasadena, California